Tacit Relocation in Scots Law is a principle whereby leases of land or buildings are renewed on the same conditions as previously existed if no notice of termination is given within the requisite period, subject to a minimum period of one year, applying in perpetuity until such notice is given. The concept is also known in the law of South Africa.

References
Patrick Fraser and William Campbell. Treatise on Master and Servant, Employer and Workman, and Master and Apprentice, according to the Law of Scotland. Third Edition. T & T Clark. George Street, Edindburgh. 1882. Page 58.
Viscount of Stair and John S More. The Institutions of the Law of Scotland. New Edition. Printed for Bell & Bradfute. Edinburgh. 1832. Volume 1. Pages 428, 429, 447, 451, 452, 454, 457 and 461. See also Notes P, W and X at pages civ, ccxxxiii and cclvi.

Business terms
Legal terminology
Scots law
United Kingdom business law
Contract law
Renting
South African business law